South Carolina Highway 171 (SC 171) is a  state highway located entirely within Charleston County in the U.S. state of South Carolina. The highway travels from Folly Beach north to SC 7 in Charleston; it is the only road connecting Folly Island to the South Carolina mainland. SC 171 is maintained by the South Carolina Department of Transportation.

Route description
SC 171 begins at an intersection with Arctic Avenue in Folly Beach; the Folly Beach Fishing Pier and the Atlantic Ocean lie to the south. The route heads north-northwest through Folly Beach's business district as Center Street. From here, the highway crosses the Folly River onto Long Island; this crossing is the only road connecting Folly Island to the rest of South Carolina. The road passes several homes before crossing to James Island, where it turns to the north as Folly Road. After crossing James Island Creek, the highway meets the southern terminus of SC 30, also known as the James Island Connector. Past this junction, SC 171 intersects the eastern terminus of SC 700 before crossing Wappoo Creek to leave James Island. The highway heads through a mainly residential area to intersect U.S. Route 17; shortly thereafter, the route meets SC 61, and the two routes head west-northwest concurrently. After passing through a business district for  the two highways separate, and SC 171 again heads northward. The highway passes Charles Towne Landing, a state historic site and the location of the first permanent English settlement in the state, before merging into SC 7 at its northern terminus.

Major intersections

See also

References

External links

SC 171 at Virginia Highways' South Carolina Highways Annex

171
Transportation in Charleston, South Carolina
Transportation in Charleston County, South Carolina